Sexual fetishism or erotic fetishism is a sexual fixation on a nonliving object or nongenital body part. The object of interest is called the fetish; the person who has a fetish for that object is a fetishist. A sexual fetish may be regarded as a non-pathological aid to sexual excitement, or as a mental disorder if it causes significant psychosocial distress for the person or has detrimental effects on important areas of their life. Sexual arousal from a particular body part can be further classified as partialism.

While medical definitions restrict the term sexual fetishism to objects or body parts, fetish can, in common discourse, also refer to sexual interest in specific activities.

Definitions 
In common parlance, the word fetish is used to refer to any sexually arousing stimuli, not all of which meet the medical criteria for fetishism. This broader usage of fetish covers parts or features of the body (including obesity and body modifications), objects, situations and activities (such as smoking or BDSM). Paraphilias such as urophilia, necrophilia and coprophilia have been described as fetishes.

Originally, most medical sources defined fetishism as a sexual interest in non-living objects, body parts or secretions. The publication of the DSM-III in 1980 changed that by excluding arousal from body parts in its diagnostic criteria for fetishism. In 1987, a revised edition of the DSM-III (DSM-III-R) introduced a new diagnosis for body part arousal, called partialism. The DSM-IV retained this distinction. Martin Kafka argued that partialism should be merged into fetishism because of overlap between the two conditions, and the DSM-5 subsequently did so in 2013. The ICD-10 definition (World Health Organization's International Classification of Diseases) is still limited to non-living objects.

Types

In a review of 48 cases of clinical fetishism in 1983, fetishes included clothing (58.3%), rubber and rubber items (22.9%), footwear (14.6%), body parts (14.6%), leather (10.4%), and soft materials or fabrics (6.3%).

A 2007 study counted members of Internet discussion groups with the word fetish in their name. Of the groups about body parts or features, 47% belonged to groups about feet (podophilia), 9% about body fluids (including urophilia, scatophilia, lactaphilia, menophilia, mucophilia), 9% about body size, 7% about hair (hair fetish), and 5% about muscles (muscle worship). Less popular groups focused on navels (navel fetishism), legs, body hair, mouth, and nails, among other things. Of the groups about clothing, 33% belonged to groups about clothes worn on the legs or buttocks (such as stockings or skirts), 32% about footwear (shoe fetishism), 12% about underwear (underwear fetishism), and 9% about whole-body wear such as jackets. Less popular object groups focused on headwear, stethoscopes, wristwear, pacifiers, and diapers (diaper fetishism).

Erotic asphyxiation is the use of choking to increase the pleasure in sex. The fetish also includes an individualized part that involves choking oneself during the act of masturbation, which is known as auto-erotic asphyxiation. This usually involves a person being connected and strangled by a homemade device that is tight enough to give them pleasure but not tight enough to suffocate them to death. This is dangerous due to the issue of hyperactive pleasure seeking which can result in strangulation when there is no one to help if the device gets too tight and strangles the user.

Devotism involves being attracted to body modifications on another person that are the result of amputation. Devotism is only a sexual fetish when the person who has the fetish considers the amputated body part on another person the object of sexual interest.

Cause 

Fetishism usually becomes evident during puberty, and may develop prior to that. No single cause for fetishism has been conclusively established.

Some explanations invoke classical conditioning. In several experiments, men have been conditioned to show arousal to stimuli like boots, geometric shapes or penny jars by pairing these cues with conventional erotica. According to John Bancroft, conditioning alone cannot explain fetishism, because it does not result in fetishism for most people. He suggests that conditioning combines with some other factor, such as an abnormality in the sexual learning process.

Theories of sexual imprinting propose that humans learn to recognize sexually desirable features and activities during childhood. Fetishism could result when a child is imprinted with an overly narrow or incorrect concept of a sex object. Imprinting seems to occur during the child's earliest experiences with arousal and desire, and is based on "an egocentric evaluation of salient reward- or pleasure-related characteristics that differ from one individual to another."

Neurological differences may play a role in some cases. Vilayanur S. Ramachandran observed that the region processing sensory input from the feet lies immediately next to the region processing genital stimulation, and suggested an accidental link between these regions could explain the prevalence of foot fetishism. In one unusual case, an anterior temporal lobectomy relieved an epileptic man's fetish for safety pins.

Various explanations have been put forth for the rarity of female fetishists. Most fetishes are visual in nature, and males are thought to be more sexually sensitive to visual stimuli. Roy Baumeister suggests that male sexuality is unchangeable, except for a brief period in childhood during which fetishism could become established, while female sexuality is fluid throughout life.

Diagnosis 
The ICD-10 defines fetishism as a reliance on non-living objects for sexual arousal and satisfaction. It is only considered a disorder when fetishistic activities are the foremost source of sexual satisfaction, and become so compelling or unacceptable as to cause distress or interfere with normal sexual intercourse. The ICD's research guidelines require that the preference persists for at least six months, and is markedly distressing or acted on.

Under the DSM-5, fetishism is sexual arousal from nonliving objects or specific nongenital body parts, excluding clothes used for cross-dressing (as that falls under transvestic disorder) and sex toys that are designed for genital stimulation. In order to be diagnosed as fetishistic disorder, the arousal must persist for at least six months and cause significant psychosocial distress or impairment in important areas of their life. In the DSM-IV, sexual interest in body parts was distinguished from fetishism under the name partialism (diagnosed as Paraphilia NOS), but it was merged with fetishistic disorder for the DSM-5.

The ReviseF65 project has campaigned for the ICD diagnosis to be abolished completely to avoid stigmatizing fetishists. Sexologist Odd Reiersøl argues that distress associated with fetishism is often caused by shame, and that being subject to diagnosis only exacerbates that. He suggests that, in cases where the individual fails to control harmful behavior, they instead be diagnosed with a personality or impulse control disorder.

Treatment 

According to the World Health Organization, fetishistic fantasies are common and should only be treated as a disorder when they impair normal functioning or cause distress. Goals of treatment can include elimination of criminal activity, reduction in reliance on the fetish for sexual satisfaction, improving relationship skills, reducing or removing arousal to the fetish altogether, or increasing arousal towards more acceptable stimuli. The evidence for treatment efficacy is limited and largely based on case studies, and no research on treatment for female fetishists exists.

Cognitive behavioral therapy is one popular approach. Cognitive behavioral therapists teach clients to identify and avoid antecedents to fetishistic behavior, and substitute non-fetishistic fantasies for ones involving the fetish. Aversion therapy and covert conditioning can reduce fetishistic arousal in the short term, but requires repetition to sustain the effect. Multiple case studies have also reported treating fetishistic behavior with psychodynamic approaches.

Antiandrogens may be prescribed to lower sex drive. Cyproterone acetate is the most commonly used antiandrogen, except in the United States, where it may not be available. A large body of literature has shown that it reduces general sexual fantasies. Side effects may include osteoporosis, liver dysfunction, and feminization. Case studies have found that the antiandrogen medroxyprogesterone acetate is successful in reducing sexual interest, but can have side effects including osteoporosis, diabetes, deep vein thrombosis, feminization, and weight gain. Some hospitals use leuprorelin and goserelin to reduce libido, and while there is presently little evidence for their efficacy, they have fewer side effects than other antiandrogens. A number of studies support the use of selective serotonin reuptake inhibitors (SSRIs), which may be preferable over antiandrogens because of their relatively benign side effects. Pharmacological agents are an adjunctive treatment which are usually combined with other approaches for maximum effect.

Relationship counselors may attempt to reduce dependence on the fetish and improve partner communication using techniques like sensate focusing. Partners may agree to incorporate the fetish into their activities in a controlled, time-limited manner, or set aside only certain days to practice the fetishism. If the fetishist cannot sustain an erection without the fetish object, the therapist might recommend orgasmic reconditioning or covert sensitization to increase arousal to normal stimuli (although the evidence base for these techniques is weak).

Epidemiology 
The prevalence of fetishism is not known with certainty. Fetishism is more common in males. In a 2011 study, 30% of men reported fetishistic fantasies, and 24.5% had engaged in fetishistic acts. Of those reporting fantasies, 45% said the fetish was intensely sexually arousing. In a 2014 study, 26.3% of women and 27.8% of men acknowledged any fantasies about "having sex with a fetish or non-sexual object". A content analysis of the sample's favorite fantasies found that 14% of the male fantasies involved fetishism (including feet, nonsexual objects, and specific clothing), and 4.7% focused on a specific body part other than feet. None of the women's favorite fantasies had fetishistic themes. Another study found that 28% of men and 11% of women reported fetishistic arousal (including feet, fabrics, and objects "like shoes, gloves, or plush toys"). 18% of men in a 1980 study reported fetishistic fantasies.

Fetishism to the extent that it becomes a disorder appears to be rare, with less than 1% of general psychiatric patients presenting fetishism as their primary problem. It is also uncommon in forensic populations.

History 
The word fetish derives from the French fétiche, which comes from the Portuguese feitiço ("spell"), which in turn derives from the Latin facticius ("artificial") and facere ("to make"). A fetish is an object believed to have supernatural powers, or in particular, a man-made object that has power over others. Essentially, fetishism is the attribution of inherent value or powers to an object. Fétichisme was first used in an erotic context by Alfred Binet in 1887. A slightly earlier concept was Julien Chevalier's azoophilie.

Early perspectives on cause 
Alfred Binet suspected fetishism was the pathological result of associations. He argued that, in certain vulnerable individuals, an emotionally rousing experience with the fetish object in childhood could lead to fetishism. Richard von Krafft-Ebing and Havelock Ellis also believed that fetishism arose from associative experiences, but disagreed on what type of predisposition was necessary.

The sexologist Magnus Hirschfeld followed another line of thought when he proposed his theory of partial attractiveness in 1920. According to his argument, sexual attractiveness never originates in a person as a whole but always is the product of the interaction of individual features. He stated that nearly everyone had special interests and thus suffered from a healthy kind of fetishism, while only detaching and overvaluing of a single feature resulted in pathological fetishism. Today, Hirschfeld's theory is often mentioned in the context of gender role specific behavior: females present sexual stimuli by highlighting body parts, clothes or accessories; males react to them.

Sigmund Freud believed that sexual fetishism in men derived from the unconscious fear of the mother's genitals, from men's universal fear of castration, and from a man's fantasy that his mother had had a penis but that it had been cut off. He did not discuss sexual fetishism in women.

In 1951, Donald Winnicott presented his theory of transitional objects and phenomena, according to which childish actions like thumb sucking and objects like cuddly toys are the source of manifold adult behavior, amongst many others fetishism. He speculated that the child's transitional object became sexualized.

Other animals 

Human fetishism has been compared to Pavlovian conditioning of sexual response in other animals. Sexual attraction to certain cues can be artificially induced in rats. Both male and female rats will develop a sexual preference for neutrally or even noxiously scented partners if those scents are paired with their early sexual experiences. Injecting morphine or oxytocin into a male rat during its first exposure to scented females has the same effect. Rats will also develop sexual preferences for the location of their early sexual experiences, and can be conditioned to show increased arousal in the presence of objects such as a plastic toy fish. One experiment found that rats which are made to wear a Velcro tethering jacket during their formative sexual experiences exhibit severe deficits in sexual performance when not wearing the jacket. Similar sexual conditioning has been demonstrated in gouramis, marmosets and Japanese quails.

Possible boot fetishism has been reported in two different primates from the same zoo. Whenever a boot was placed near the first, a common chimpanzee born in captivity, he would invariably stare at it, touch it, become erect, rub his penis against the boot, masturbate, and then consume his ejaculate. The second, a guinea baboon, would become erect while rubbing and smelling the boot, but not masturbate or touch it with his penis.

See also 

Clothing fetishism and fetish-related
 Clothing fetish
 Cosplay
 PVC clothing
 Sexual roleplay
 Uniform fetishism

References

Further reading 

 
 Bienvenu, Robert (2003). The Development of Sadomasochism as a Cultural Style in the Twentieth-Century United States. Online PDF under Sadomasochism as a Cultural Style.
 
 
 
 
 
 Коловрат Ю. А. Сексуальное волховство и фаллоктенические культы древних славян // История Змиевского края. – Змиев. – 19.10.2008.

External links

Sexual fetishism
Sexual dysfunctions